Björn Sengier (born 12 July 1979) is a retired Belgian footballer who played as a goalkeeper.

Career
Sengier is a goalkeeper who was born in Ghent and made his debut in professional football, being part of the Cercle Brugge squad in the 1999-2000 season. He also played for K.M.S.K. Deinze and Zulte Waregem before joining Willem II. He left Willem II in September 2008, and moved to K.V.S.K. United Overpelt-Lommel.

References

External links
 
 

1979 births
Living people
Belgian footballers
Cercle Brugge K.S.V. players
S.V. Zulte Waregem players
Willem II (football club) players
Helmond Sport players
Royal Antwerp F.C. players
Eerste Divisie players
Association football goalkeepers
Belgian expatriate footballers
Expatriate footballers in the Netherlands
Lommel S.K. players
K.M.S.K. Deinze players
Footballers from Ghent
Sportkring Sint-Niklaas players